The Evolve Championship was a professional wrestling championship owned by the Evolve promotion. The inaugural champion was crowned on April 5, 2013, when A. R. Fox defeated Sami Callihan in the finals of an eight-man tournament.

Like most professional wrestling championships, the title was won as a result of a scripted match. There have been ten reigns shared among ten wrestlers.

History
Evolve was founded in 2009 by Dragon Gate USA booker Gabe Sapolsky, Full Impact Pro (FIP) owner Sal Hamaoui and independent wrestler Davey Richards and held its first event on January 16, 2010. Originally, Evolve had no championships, instead putting emphasis on each wrestler's win–loss record. On November 25, 2011, Evolve and Dragon Gate USA announced the unification of the two promotions, which would result in Evolve recognizing the Open the Freedom Gate and Open the United Gate Championships as its top two titles. However, on September 8, 2012, Evolve announced that the promotion would be introducing its first own title, the Evolve Championship. The title was defended outside of the United States for the first time on August 29, 2014, when champion Drew Galloway retained against Johnny Moss at an event in Kilmarnock, Scotland. Following multiple successful international championship defenses by Galloway, he dubbed the title the "Evolve World Championship" on January 9, 2015, at Evolve 36. However, with some exceptions, the promotion mainly continued referring to the title as simply the Evolve Championship. 

During Galloway's record-breaking reign, the title was defended internationally in Scotland, England, Northern Ireland and Australia for promotions such as Revolution Pro Wrestling, British Championship Wrestling, WrestleZone, Rock N Wrestle, Future Pro Wrestling, Outback Championship Wrestling, Premier British Wrestling and Pro Wrestling Ulster. During the subsequent Timothy Thatcher title reign, the title was also defended three times in Germany for Westside Xtreme Wrestling. 

In the EVOLVE's home country, the title was also defended in outside defenses for Premiere Wrestling Xperience, Big Time Wrestling, Atlanta Wrestling Entertainment, MAGNUM Pro Wrestling, WWNLive, Pro Wrestling Force, DGUSA and on a EVOLVE/WWN crossover event with Progress Wrestling.

Thatcher went on to break Galloway's records for the longest reign and most defences in the title's history, holding it for 596 days, before losing it to Zack Sabre Jr. on February 25, 2017.

Championship tournament
On February 8, 2013, Evolve announced that the inaugural Evolve Champion would be determined in a single-elimination tournament on April 5, 2013. Based on their win–loss records, number one seed Chuck Taylor and number two seed Ricochet earned automatic spots in the semifinals of the tournament, while number three and four seeds A. R. Fox and Jon Davis earned spots in the first round of the tournament. The second first round match was a four-way match made up of Rich Swann, Samuray del Sol, Sami Callihan and Jigsaw, seeds five to eight, respectively. The entire tournament took place during the Evolve 19 internet pay-per-view (iPPV) in Secaucus, New Jersey. In their first round matches, A. R. Fox advanced with a disqualification win over Jon Davis, while Sami Callihan submitted Samuray del Sol to win the four-way match. In the semifinals, both the number one and number two seeds were eliminated, when Callihan submitted Chuck Taylor and Fox pinned Ricochet. In the end, Fox pinned Callihan in the finals to win the tournament and become the inaugural Evolve Champion.

Title history

Names

Reigns

See also
Evolve
Evolve Tag Team Championship
Open the Freedom Gate Championship
WWN Championship

References

External links
Official Evolve website
Evolve Championship

Evolve (professional wrestling) championships
Dragon Gate USA championships
WWNLive championships